Auchengray railway station was just outside Auchengray, a hamlet in the Parish of Carnwath, South Lanarkshire, Scotland. It was served by local trains on what is now known as the West Coast Main Line.

It is near Tarbrax and Woolfords.  The Wilsontown Ironworks Branch ran from just to the north.

There is  now no station convenient for Auchengray.

History

Opened by the Caledonian Railway it became part of the London Midland and Scottish Railway during the Grouping of 1923, passing on to the Scottish Region of British Railways during the nationalisation of 1948. It was then closed by the British Railways Board.

The site today

Trains pass at speed on the West Coast Main Line but there is no station at the site now.

References

 
 
 Station on navigable O.S. map

Disused railway stations in South Lanarkshire
Railway stations in Great Britain opened in 1848
Railway stations in Great Britain closed in 1966
Beeching closures in Scotland
Former Caledonian Railway stations